Tehran is the capital city of Iran.

Tehran or Teheran may also refer to:

In Iran
Tehran Province
Tehran TV
Tehran Metro
Tehran (Sadeghiyeh) Metro Station
Tehran University
Tehran's Grand Bazaar
Tehran International Fair
Tehranpars
Tehransar
Tehran Conference
Pas Tehran, a football club
Tiran, Iran, a city in Isfahan Province

Other
Tehran (film), a 1946 British film
Tehran: City of Love, a 2018 Iranian film
Tehran (horse) (1941–1966), a British Thoroughbred racehorse
Tehran (TV series), a 2020 Israeli espionage drama series
"Tehran" (Veep), a television episode
Tehran, a 1988 demo tape by the Offspring
Julio Teherán (born 1991), Colombian baseball pitcher

See also
Teheran 43, a 1981 film
Teheranno (Tehran Street), a street in Seoul, South Korea
Tehrangeles, a neighborhood in Los Angeles, California, US

 Teran (disambiguation)